Germanos Dimakos (1912–2004) was a Greek priest and prominent member of the Greek Resistance during World War II, fighting in the ranks of the Greek People's Liberation Army (ELAS). He is best known by his nom de guerre, Papa-Anypomonos (Παπα-Ανυπόμονος, "Father Impatient").

He was born Georgios Dimakos in 1912, in the village of Agrydaki in Gortynia. He was ordained a deacon on 29 July 1934, adopting the name Germanos. In 1940, when Greece entered World War II, he was the hegumenos of the Agathonos Monastery near Ypati in Phthiotis. After the start of the Axis Occupation of Greece, he became a member of the Communist-sponsored National Liberation Front (EAM), and served as chairman of the community of Dadi. On 14 May 1943 at the village of Koukouvista he met Aris Velouchiotis, the chief captain of ELAS, EAM's guerrilla wing. Henceforth Dimakos became a close associate of Velouchiotis, following him in his tours around Greece. His bravery and zeal earned him the sobriquet Papa-Anypomonos from Velouchiotis himself.

Following the Varkiza agreement of 1945 and the disbandment of ELAS, he returned to the Agathonos Monastery. In 1946, during the "White Terror" preceding the outbreak of the Greek Civil War, he was kidnapped and tortured by a right-wing band. The Regime of the Colonels also persecuted him as a communist sympathizer, and sent him before the Synodical Court in 1968, where he was acquitted. Only during the last years of his life was his role in the Resistance acknowledged and honoured by the Church of Greece. He was interviewed for the 1986 British documentary Greece: The Hidden War. In 2010 the new park of Vytina was named after him.

Sources
 
  
 

1912 births
2004 deaths
Greek Eastern Orthodox priests
20th-century Eastern Orthodox priests
21st-century Eastern Orthodox priests
Greek People's Liberation Army personnel
People from Vytina